The Saskatchewan Rush are a lacrosse team based in Saskatoon, Saskatchewan playing in the National Lacrosse League (NLL). The 2023 season is the 17th in franchise history, 7th in Saskatchewan.

Jimmy Quinlan will be the head coach. In the 2022 season, Quinlan co-coached the last four games with Derek Keenan after Jeff McComb was fired mid-season.

Current standings

Game log

Regular season
Reference:

Current roster
Reference:

Entry Draft
The 2022 NLL Entry Draft took place on September 10, 2022. The Rush made the following selections:

See also
2023 NLL season

References

Saskatchewan Rush
Saskatchewan Rush seasons
Saskatchewan Rush